A frequency-lock, or frequency-locked loop (FLL), is an electronic control system that generates a signal that is locked to the frequency of an input or "reference" signal. This circuit compares the frequency of a controlled oscillator to the reference, automatically raising or lowering the frequency of the oscillator until its frequency (but not necessarily its phase) is matched to that of the reference.

A frequency-locked loop is an example of a control system using negative feedback. Frequency-lock loops are used in radio, telecommunications, computers and other electronic applications to generate stable frequencies, or to recover a signal from a noisy communication channel.

See also 
Phase-locked loop

References

Electronic design